Antoine Magnol (1676 – 10 March 1759) was a French physician and botanist born in Montpellier. He was the son of the notable botanist Pierre Magnol (1638–1715). 

In 1696 he obtained his medical doctorate, and in 1715 became a full professor at the University of Montpellier. Antoine Magnol maintained a professorship at Montpellier in an official capacity for many years.

Published works 
He is known for posthumous edition of his father's works, especially the 1720 publication of Novus caracter [sic] plantarum. Other written works associated with Antoine Magnol include:
 , (1710; August Moreau, thesis/dissertation).
  (Montpellier, 1719; Bernard de Jussieu, dissertation, Antoine Magnol: praeses).
 , (1731; Pierre Laulanié: respondent, dissertation). 
  (Montpellier, 1741, with Louis Laugier).

References 
 "This article incorporates text based on a translation of an equivalent article at the French Wikipedia".

1676 births
1759 deaths
18th-century French physicians
Academic staff of the University of Montpellier
18th-century French botanists
Physicians from Montpellier